Carolee Ann Carmello (born September 1, 1962) is an American actress best known for her performances in Broadway musicals and for playing the role of Maple LaMarsh on the television series Remember WENN (1996–1998). She is a three-time Tony Award nominee and a five-time Drama Desk nominee, winning the 1999 Drama Desk Award for Outstanding Actress in a Musical for her role in Parade.

Career

Carmello graduated from the University at Albany with a degree in business administration.

Carmello made her Broadway debut in a small role in City of Angels and returned to close the show in the role of "Oolie/Donna". She left City of Angels to take the role of Florence in the tour of Chess, from January 1990 to May 1990. She played "Cordelia, the kosher caterer" in the original Broadway company of Falsettos and also played Abigail Adams in the revival of 1776. In the Broadway company of The Scarlet Pimpernel, Carmello was a replacement in the role of "Marguerite St. Just". She originated the role of Lucille Frank in Parade at Lincoln Center, for which she won the 1999 Drama Desk Award for Outstanding Actress in a Musical (in a tie with Bernadette Peters) and was nominated for the Tony Award for Best Actress in a Musical. Next Carmello played "Kate" in the Broadway revival of Kiss Me, Kate and "Ms. Pennywise" in Urinetown. She starred as "Gabrielle" in Lestat, for which she received nominations for the Drama Desk Award for Outstanding Featured Actress in a Musical and the Tony Award for Best Featured Actress in a Musical.

She appeared as Donna Sheridan in the long-running hit musical Mamma Mia! several times, joining the show initially in October 2004. She again joined the cast as Donna in September 2006, taking a leave from March 14, 2007, to May 13, 2007, to appear in an early version of Saving Aimee.

Carmello originated the role of Alice Beineke in the musical version of The Addams Family. For this role she was nominated for the Drama Desk Award and the Outer Critics Circle Award for Outstanding Featured Actress in a Musical.

She took over the role of the Mother Superior from Victoria Clark in the Broadway production of Sister Act on November 19, 2011. In 2012, she played Aimee Semple McPherson on Broadway in the musical Scandalous, for which she received a Drama Desk nomination and a Tony Award nomination for Best Lead Actress in a Musical. She performed the role of Mrs. du Maurier in the Broadway musical Finding Neverland from March 2015 through February 2016 and was nominated for a Drama Desk Award for Best Featured Actress in a Musical.

Carmello appeared in the role of Mae Tuck in the Broadway musical adaptation of Tuck Everlasting at the Broadhurst Theatre, beginning in April 2016. Following Tuck Everlasting'''s closing in May, she returned to Finding Neverland on July 5, 2016, for the show's last six weeks.

Carmello joined the US national tour of Hello, Dolly, playing Dolly Levi, from September 2019 to its closing in March 2020. In 2023, Carmello played the role of the Stepmother in the Broadway musical Bad Cinderella.

Theatre credits

Broadway
Sources: Playbill, BroadwayWorld

National tours
 Big River as Mary Jane Wilkes (1987)
 Les Misérables (1987)
 Falsettos as Trina (1993)
 Chess as Florence (January 1990-May 1990)Hello, Dolly! as Dolly Gallagher Levi (September 2019-March 2020)

Regional
 Bells are Ringing Reprise! (Los Angeles), 1999
 The King and I Paper Mill Playhouse (Millburn, New Jersey), 2002
 On The Twentieth Century as Lily Garland, Reprise! (Los Angeles), 2003
 Baby as Arlene Paper Mill Playhouse (Millburn, New Jersey) 2004
 Saving Aimee Signature Theatre (Arlington, Virginia) 2007
 Little Shop of Horrors Charles Playhouse (Boston)
 Scandalous (Pavilion Theatre (Glasgow / UK)
 The Music Man (Schenectady Light Opera)
 Grease as Sandy (Pittsburgh C.L.O) 1989
 Tuck Everlasting (Alliance Theatre, Atlanta Georgia), 2015
 Gypsy at Broadway At Music Circus in Sacramento, California 2018Sweeney Todd as Mrs. Lovett (Opera Saratoga), 2022

Off-Broadway
Sources: Internet Off-Broadway Database, BroadwayWorld

 I Can Get It for You Wholesale (1991)
 Hello Again (1993)
 Das Barbecu (1994)
 John & Jen (1995)
 A Class Act (2000)
 The Vagina Monologues (2000)
 Elegies (2003)
 Sweeney Todd: The Demon Barber of Fleet Street (2017) as Mrs. Nellie Lovett

ConcertsFunny Girl (Actors Fund Benefit Concert), 2002
 God Bless You, Mr. Rosewater as Sylvia Rosewater (Cooper Union), 2003
 Showboat as Julie (Carnegie Hall), 2008
 1776'' (54 Below), 2017

Accolades
Source: Playbill

Awards and Nominations

Personal life
She is divorced from fellow actor Gregg Edelman. They have two children. She resides in Leonia, New Jersey.

References

External links
 
 
 
 Carolee Carmello interview, American Theatre Wing website (via soundcloud.com)

1962 births
American film actresses
American musical theatre actresses
American stage actresses
American television actresses
Living people
Actors from Albany, New York
People from Leonia, New Jersey
People from Teaneck, New Jersey
20th-century American actresses
Drama Desk Award winners
21st-century American actresses
Actresses from New York (state)
University at Albany, SUNY alumni